Birmingham Symphonic Winds (BSW) is a UK-based amateur wind orchestra in the style of the Eastman Wind Ensemble.

BSW was established in 1992 by its Musical Director, Keith Allen, with the aim of offering local players the opportunity to perform high-quality wind repertoire and contemporary compositions.  It promotes its own themed concert series at the CBSO Centre, Birmingham, home to the City of Birmingham Symphony Orchestra, and has performed numerous UK and world premieres, including works by Samuel Hazo, Philip Sparke, Martin Ellerby, Kenneth Hesketh and Guy Woolfenden, the orchestra's patron.

BSW has performed at UK and international music festivals, including the National Concert Band Festival, the World Association of Symphonic Bands and Ensembles (WASBE) conference in Schladming, Austria and the 4th International Wind Band Festival in Strasbourg.  BSW was the first ever UK ensemble to perform at the Midwest Clinic, Chicago in December 2003. BSW also performed at the WASBE Conference in Killarney, Ireland in July 2007.

External links
Birmingham Symphonic Winds

Musical groups established in 1992
English classical music groups
Wind bands
Musical groups from Birmingham, West Midlands
1992 establishments in England